Charles de La Porte (1602 in Paris – 8 February 1664 in Paris) was a French nobleman and general. He was marquis then duke of La Meilleraye, duke of Rethel and peer of France, baron of Parthenay and of Saint-Maixent, count of Secondigny, seigneur of Le Boisliet, La Lunardière, La Jobelinière and Villeneuve.

In 1639 he became Marshal of France after taking Hesdin.

In 1642, after a ten-month siege, he conquered Perpignan and Salses-le-Château, completing the conquest of Roussillon.

External links
 La Porte

1602 births
1664 deaths
Nobility from Paris
French generals
Marshals of France
French Ministers of Finance
Peers of France
Military personnel of the Franco-Spanish War (1635–1659)
Military personnel from Paris